Milton Thiago de Mello (born February 5, 1916) is a veterinarian and the dean of Brazilian primatology. He is a strong voice for biological conservation of Brazil's megadiverse flora and fauna.

As a professional veterinarian and zoological researcher, de Mello has received awards and distinctions from many governments and organizations, such as from the Comité Français de l’Association Mondiale Vétérinaire, the World Veterinary Epidemiology Society, the Sociedad Colombiana de Primatologia and the John Guggenhiem Memorial. He is an honorary member of the Royal Academy of Veterinary Sciences of London, the American Academy of Microbiology, and the New York Academy of Sciences. He was awarded the Medal of Merit in Veterinary Medicine, at the highest level (Grã-Cruz). He is a consultant with the Pan-American Health Organization and the Food and Agriculture Agency of the United Nations. He belongs to more than 30 Brazilian and international scientific societies, of which he has helped found 14 and served as an official of at least 12. He is the author of numerous books and over 150 scientific papers on primates, brucellosis, bubonic plague, medical mycology, the teaching of veterinary medicine, and the environmental crisis in Brazil and other countries.

The recently founded Milton Thiago de Mello Environmental Institute, in Sobradinho, Distrito Federal, Brazil, is named after him.

Almost all Brazilian primatologists have, at one time or another, studied under de Mello.

He turned 100 in February 2016.

See also
Milton's titi

References

External links
Milton Thiago de Mello biography at the Oswaldo Cruz Institute, on-line at: 

1916 births
Living people
Brazilian centenarians
Men centenarians